Greatest Hits is the fourth studio album by American rock band Waterparks. It is the band's only album with the label 300 Entertainment and was released on May 21, 2021.

Release

The album's lead single, "Lowkey as Hell", was released on September 25, 2020, with the simultaneous announcement of their label transition. The second single, "Snow Globe", debuted on February 26, 2021. A few weeks later, the band posted a cryptic URL which allowed users to unscramble the word "NUMB," and would receive a musical snippet upon doing so. The third single of the same name was released on March 29. The website trend would continue, this time featuring a peephole with a forwards counter above it. The fourth single, "You'd Be Paranoid Too (If Everyone Was Out To Get You)", was released on April 28, 2021, sharing its title with an autobiography written by vocalist and rhythm guitarist Awsten Knight. The fifth single, "Just Kidding", was released on May 12, 2021. The sixth single, "Violet!", was released May 18, 2021. A music video was released for the song on May 26, 2021.

Despite heavy involvement with the production of previous releases, Greatest Hits is the first Waterparks album for which Knight is explicitly credited as a producer. The album's cover art was shot by British photographer Phil Knott.

Composition 
Greatest Hits has been mainly described as pop punk, hyperpop, pop, rap, pop rock, alternative rock, and contains elements of drum and bass, industrial, grunge, orchestral, emo rap, stadium rock, and lo-fi.

Reception

Greatest Hits received critical acclaim. At Metacritic, which assigns a normalized rating out of 100 to reviews from mainstream critics, the album has an average score of 82 out of 100 based on 4 reviews, indicating "critical acclaim". Matt Collar of AllMusic was positive and considered to songs on Greatest Hits to be "stadium-sized singalong anthems". Stevie Blackburn of Dead Press! praised the album and stated that "[the album's] seventeen tracks completely deliver...[and] with the talent that Waterparks possess they have an extremely long and bright career ahead of them." Sarah Jamieson of DIY praised the band's experimentation with various genres stating that it "make[s] Greatest Hits feel like a whirlwind of genres that far exceed the "pop rock" label that's been placed on them." Writing for Dork, Jamie MacMillan called the album "great" and stated that the album was "full of hits". Emily Carter of Kerrang! praised the songwriting on the album stating, "Waterparks have genuinely done everything; not so much simply just opening the metaphorical artistic door to give listeners a peek at their sky-high songwriting aspirations, but truly throwing all they have into 17 songs of pure chaotic – but carefully-crafted, don’t forget that – brilliance." 

Ali Shutler of NME called the album a "bold step into sprawling new territory". Writing for Upset, Stephen Ackroyd described the album's sound by stating, "never anything but in your face, it switches from pop-punk to full-on hyper-pop banger at will." Wall of Sound praised the album and considered the album to have a "different vibe to it" than their 2019 album, Fandom.

Track listing

Notes
 "See You in in the Future" was originally titled without the duplicate "in". It was changed in early November 2021 in response to a misspelt fan tattoo.

Personnel
Credits adapted from Tidal.

Waterparks
 Awsten Knight – lead vocals, guitar, bass, additional programming, artwork, layout, percussion (track 3), keyboards (track 3)
 Geoff Wigington – guitar, vocals
 Otto Wood – drums, vocals

Additional musicians
 Zakk Cervini – keyboards (track 3)
 Jared Poythress – keyboards (track 3)
 Lucy Landry - vocal (track 4)
 Andrew Goldstein – piano (track 3)
 Mikey Way – bass (track 10)
 Chris Carrabba – vocals (track 10)
 De'Wayne – vocals (track 10)
 Dallon Weekes – vocals (track 11)
 Zeph – vocals (track 15)

Production
 Awsten Knight – production
 Zakk Cervini – production, engineering, mastering, mixing
 Jared Poythress –  additional production (tracks 5, 7, and 13)
 Chris Gehringer – mastering
 Jeff Fenster – A&R Direction

Charts

References 

2021 albums
Waterparks (band) albums